The Sydney Town Hall Grand Organ is a large pipe organ built by English firm William Hill & Son in 1890. It is located in the Centennial Hall of Sydney Town Hall in Sydney, New South Wales, Australia.

When it was installed in 1890, the Sydney Town Hall Grand Organ was the largest in the world and remained the largest concert organ built in the 19th century. It was described by Westminster Abbey's organist, Dr Bridge, as the 'finest organ ever built by an English organ builder'.  It remains the world's largest organ without any electric action components and is of international significance. It contains one of only two full-length 64′ organ stops in the world (the Contra-Trombone in the pedal). The other 64′ stop is the Diaphone-Dulzian in the Right Stage chamber (Pedal Right division) of the Boardwalk Hall Auditorium Organ at Boardwalk Hall in Atlantic City, New Jersey, United States.

History
In 1973, Sydney Council began a major restoration program to address the mechanical problems it had begun to experience. Managing the program was R H Pogson Pty Ltd, whose employees worked for almost 10 years to restore the organ to its original form.

Sydney Town Hall today also holds free organ recitals which are held throughout the year.

Specification
The grand organ can be played from 5 manuals and features 127 stops. The specification is as follows:

Gallery

References

External links 
 The Grand Organ - City of Sydney
 The Organ Music Society of Sydney
 Sydney Town Hall Organ Specifications

Syndey, Sydney Town Hall Grand Organ
1890 establishments in Australia